Richard Walter Quick (January 31, 1943 – June 10, 2009) was the head coach of the women's swim team at Stanford University, from 1988 through 2005. He was a coach for the United States Olympic swimming team for six Olympics—1984, 1988, 1992, 1996, 2000 and 2004.  Following the 2007 season, he returned to Auburn University as head coach of the men's and women's swimming and diving team.

At the Sydney Olympics he led the women's team to sixteen medals. At Stanford he won seven NCAA titles and developed 35 NCAA champions, winning five CSCAA Coach of the Year honors and three Pac-10 Coach of the Year awards. His most successful swimmer is Jenny Thompson, who has won ten Olympic Golds. Other notable Olympians coached by Quick include Ambrose "Rowdy" Gaines, Steve Lundquist, Summer Sanders, Dara Torres and Misty Hyman. He has been head women's swimming coach at the University of Texas, where his teams won five consecutive NCAA titles (1984–1988). 

On March 8, 2007, Auburn University announced that Quick would return to the Tigers to take over as head coach for the swimming and diving teams after David Marsh left.  Quick was Marsh's coach when he was a backstroker for Auburn.  In March 2007 Marsh won his 12th NCAA National title, tying his former coach and mentor for the most (Division I) titles won by an NCAA Coach. He broke the tie the following year, winning a 13th title.

Quick was a top swimmer himself at Highland Park High School in University Park, Texas, and Southern Methodist University where he made All-Southwest Conference.  He is a member of SMU's Distinguished Alumni. In 2000 he was inducted into the International Swimming Hall of Fame. 

In December 2008 Quick was diagnosed with an inoperable brain tumor. He died on June 10, 2009. His 2008–09 Auburn team won the National title.

Collegiate coaching career
Auburn Men's and Women's head coach (2007–09)
Stanford Women's head coach (1988–2005)
Texas Women's head coach (1982–1988)
Auburn Men's and Women's head coach (1978–1982)
Iowa State Men's head coach (1977–1978)
Southern Methodist Women's head coach (1976–1977)
Southern Methodist Men's assistant coach (1971–1975)

References

1943 births
2009 deaths
American male swimmers
American swimming coaches
Auburn Tigers swimming coaches
SMU Mustangs men's swimmers
Stanford Cardinal swimming coaches
National team coaches
Swimmers from Akron, Ohio
Deaths from brain cancer in the United States
American Olympic coaches
Texas Longhorns swimming coaches
Iowa State Cyclones swimming coaches
SMU Mustangs swimming coaches